Wrexham Glyndŵr University is a public research university in the north-east of Wales, with campuses in Wrexham, Northop and St Asaph. It offers both undergraduate and postgraduate degrees, as well as professional courses.

Formerly known as the North East Wales Institute of Higher Education (NEWI), it was granted full university status in 2008 after being a member of the University of Wales since 2004. The university is named after the medieval Welsh prince Owain Glyndŵr, who suggested the establishment of universities in Wales, and was born near Wrexham.

The university's School of Creative Arts operates the Wall Recording Studio on its Plas Coch campus, the former home of Calon FM community radio station.

History
The university's origins date back to the opening of Wrexham School of Science and Art (WSSA) in 1887. At this time John Viriamu Jones called for a University of Wales. The WSSA began offering University of London-validated degrees in science in 1924. The original name of Wrexham School of Science and Art was changed several times. In 1927, it became Denbighshire Technical Institute, becoming Denbighshire Technical College in 1939 and North East Wales Institute of Higher Education in 1975 by the merger of Denbighshire Technical College, Cartrefle Teacher Training College and Kelsterton College of Connah's Quay, Deeside. Initially, its degrees were validated by the University of Salford. Some famous alumni include Andrew Gwynne (when it was North East Wales Institute of Higher Education), Gavin Roberts, and Brian Percival (as North Wales School of Art and Design).

In 1993, NEWI became an associate member of the University of Wales and all further education courses in Wrexham were moved to Yale College, Wrexham (now part of Coleg Cambria). In 2004, NEWI became a full member of the University of Wales and in 2006 became accredited by the University of Wales and exercised devolved powers to validate and deliver its own degrees. The university was officially renamed "Glyndŵr University" in July 2008 after being granted degree awarding powers. The university was visited by the Queen in 2003 and by Birgitte, Duchess of Gloucester in 2005.

In June 2014, the Home Office suspended the University's authorisation to sponsor international students.

On 24 November 2014 Glyndŵr University has had its right to sponsor international students reinstated by the Home Office.

In 2016, the university underwent a minor name change and is now called "Wrexham Glyndŵr University" in English, and "Prifysgol Glyndŵr Wrecsam" in Welsh.

Between 2008 and 2019, the main Wrexham campus of the University hosted Wales Comic Con until it moved to Telford, but returned for a one-day event in 2022.

In August 2022, the university announced it was considering re-naming itself to "Wrexham University" dropping "Glyndŵr" from its name.

Campuses
The university has various sites in Wrexham and north east Wales. From 2011 to 2018 it ran a campus in London.

Wrexham

The university has two sites in Wrexham. It houses over 70 seminar suites, conference suites, lecture theatres, workshops and laboratories, complemented with a library (the Edward Llwyd Centre) and learning resource facilities, as well as a sports centre, a Centre for the Creative Industries, the Centre for the Child, Family and Society, the Glyndŵr University Racecourse Stadium, a human performance lab, the Terry Hands studio, the Catrin Finch Centre, William Aston Hall, the Oriel Sycharth Gallery and the Welsh international hockey team.

The educational charity North Wales Science, owned by the university, operated a science discovery centre on the Plas Coch campus. The centre was open to schools and the general public, and in a partnership with Techniquest in Cardiff, was branded as 'Techniquest@NEWI' and later 'Techniquest Glyndŵr', from 2003 to 2020. In 2019, the charity decided to relocate to a site in Wrexham city centre, with their Henblas Street site opening on 3 October 2020, rebranding as 'Xplore! Science Discovery Centre'.

The other Wrexham site on Regent Street, is near to Wrexham city centre and is home to its North Wales School of Art and Design (NWSAD). It formerly housed the Denbighshire Technical College, who moved to the site in 1927 (under their previous name of Denbighshire Technical Institute).
In 2011, the university acquired the Racecourse Ground, the home of Wrexham FC, renaming it the Glyndŵr University Racecourse Stadium. The university sold the stadium back to the club on 29 June 2022.

The university has its own music recording facilities, notably The Wall Recording Studio.

Northop

The university shares the former  Welsh College of Horticulture in Northop, Flintshire, with Coleg Cambria.

Academic profile

The university runs 150 programmes, offering foundation, HND/Cs, honours and master's degrees and doctorates over a broad variety of qualifications. In addition to professional courses such as nursing and social work, the university offers a range of postgraduate and undergraduate qualifications in Art & Design, Engineering, Science, Humanities, Health and Social Care, Criminology and Criminal Justice, Sports Sciences, Computing and Communication Technology, Music technology and Business. Although all courses are offered in English there are options to study or to be assessed in Welsh. A foundation degree in professional Welsh is also available.

The North Wales School of Art and Design at Wrexham Glyndŵr University was named as the best place to study Art in Wales in the Guardian University League Tables 2017 and also ranked 12th out of all UK universities.

Wrexham Glyndwr University is also number one in North Wales for getting its students jobs after graduation. The institution achieved an employability figure of 92.1% and is also above the sector average for graduate level employment, according to the latest Destination of Leavers Survey (DLHE).

International links
The University has international partnerships across Europe, Africa and Asia and is a member of the Fair Trade Coalition.

Administration
WGU's first principal (then as NEWI) was Glyn O. Phillips. He retired in 1991 and was replaced by John O. Williams. Following the retirement of Williams in 2000, NEWI appointed Michael Scott, a former student of the University of Wales, Lampeter in 2001. He was succeeded by Professor Graham Upton in January 2015 who served as interim Vice-Chancellor until 31 March 2016. The current Vice-Chancellor is Professor Maria Hinfelaar who was the President of the Limerick Institute of Technology.

Companies
Wrexham Glyndwr University has two subsidiary companies: Glyndŵr Innovations Ltd and North Wales Science (Techniquest Glyndŵr – "TQG").

Collaborative partners include: Coleg Cambria : (Yale College & Deeside College), Coleg Menai, Coleg Llandrillo Cymru, Coleg Powys

Student life
Wrexham Glyndwr University's students come from all over the United Kingdom and the European Union. WGU is also popular with mature students. Around 54% of Wrexham Glyndwr University students are over twenty-one with 17% over the age of forty.

Accommodation
There are three main halls of residence in Wrexham, namely the Student village, Wrexham Village and Snowdon Hall as well as Corbishley Hall at Northop. The main student village is separated into houses and the houses into flats. Snowdon Hall, Bath Road and Clwyd House are near Wrexham city. The student village and Snowdon Hall are en suite and the rest are shared facilities. All of Wrexham Glyndwr University's accommodation is self-catering. Snowdon Hall is separated into five separate blocks of lockable flats and is currently leased from and run by the Opal Group.

Sports, clubs and traditions
Wrexham Glyndŵr University sport teams compete in British Universities & Colleges Sport (BUCS). In the 2017 – 18 academic year, Glyndŵr University have 9 teams competing in the BUCS structure. Team sports played at the university are; Men's Rugby Union, Women's Netball, Men's Basketball, Men's Hockey, Men's and Women's Football, Men's and Women's Futsal.

Wrexham Glyndŵr University Sports Centre houses a 1000sq. m. hall. 
The hall is overlooked by an open balcony and an enclosed spectator area on the first floor. The facility complies with national competition standards for badminton, netball, basketball, volleyball, futsal and handball.
There is also provision for table tennis and matting for martial arts.

On the first floor of the facility is a purpose-built sprung floor dance studio.

Wrexham Glyndwr University has a radio studio, sound recording studio, engineering laboratories, art gallery, IT facilities, theatre studios, motor racing team, a dedicated scene of crime lab and notably the unusual asset of a Chinese medicine clinic.

The Plas Coch site hosts an active student union as well as the student union bar, now housed in the football stadium's Centenary Club. Wrexham Glyndwr University has its own car racing team which is run by the engineering school's Car Performance degree course students. The North Wales Clinical School opened in 2007 at Wrexham Glyndŵr University's Plas Coch campus.

Also in the Plas Coch area of Wrexham are Wrexham A.F.C., North Wales Crusaders and the North Wales Regional Hockey Stadium. In August 2011, the university agreed a deal to buy Wrexham FC's Racecourse Ground.

In October 2014, former Welsh international footballer Robbie Savage was given an honorary fellowship at the university for services to sport.

See also
Armorial of UK universities
Education in Wales
List of universities in Wales
List of UK universities

References

External links

 Glyndŵr University

 
Universities and colleges in North Wales
Wrexham
Educational institutions established in 2008
2008 establishments in Wales
Education in Wrexham County Borough
Universities UK